Bruno Araújo dos Santos (born 7 February 1993), simply known as Bruno Santos, is a Brazilian professional footballer who plays as a right-back for Goiás.

Career
Born in Rio de Janeiro, Brazil, Bruno Santos started his first experience abroad, when he signed for Campeonato Nacional de Seniores side Sourense in the summer of 2013. One year later, he moved to Freamunde.

On 29 June 2015, Bruno Santos signed a three-year deal with Paços de Ferreira.

References

External links
 

1993 births
Living people
Brazilian footballers
Association football defenders
Goiás Esporte Clube players
Primeira Liga players
Liga Portugal 2 players
Cypriot First Division players
G.D. Sourense players
S.C. Freamunde players
F.C. Paços de Ferreira players
AEL Limassol players
Brazilian expatriate footballers
Brazilian expatriate sportspeople in Portugal
Brazilian expatriate sportspeople in Cyprus
Expatriate footballers in Portugal
Expatriate footballers in Cyprus
Footballers from Rio de Janeiro (city)